Hîjdieni is a village in Glodeni District, Moldova.

Notable people
 Ion Tudose

References

Villages of Glodeni District